Tony Shillitoe is an Australian fantasy writer.

His first novel Guardians was published in 1992 by Pan Macmillan. It was the first part of the Andrakis trilogy, 
soon followed by Kingmaker and Dragonlords in 1993. The trilogy was partially rewritten for the 2006 edition.

In 1995 Shillitoe published a teenage fantasy, The Last Wizard, which was shortlisted in the inaugural Aurealis Awards for Best Fantasy Novel. Several short stories and a play monologue were published in various anthologies between 1996 and 1998.

In 1999, Shillitoe published his first young adult novel, Joy Ride with Wakefield Press. Set in Adelaide in the mid-1990s, and inspired by a real news story in which two boys stole a bus and drove it up the South Eastern Freeway. The novel was popularly received by teenagers and young adults, but despised by most older readers, and did not receive positive publicity. It has been used in schools, and also in correctional institutions as a text for rehabilitating young males.

Shillitoe returned to the fantasy genre in 2002 when HarperCollins released Blood, the first book in the Ashuak Chronicles. Blood was also short-listed for Best Fantasy Novel in the Aurealis Awards in 2002. Passion and Freedom completed the Ashuak Chronicle trilogy in 2003.

2003 also saw the release of Shillitoe's second young adult novel, Caught in the Headlights, which was listed as a "Notable Book for Older Readers" by the Children's Book Council, and it has subsequently appeared on Premier's Reading Lists in South Australia, Victoria and New South Wales. In contrast with the previous novel Joy Ride, this novel espouses a more conventional moral attitude. Caught in the Headlights has been successful. It also reflects the author's zero tolerance for drugs, drawn from the experiences of several close friends who fell victim to drug use.

In 2006 Shillitoe released the first novel in a new fantasy series, the Dreaming in Amber quartet, published by HarperCollins. The second book, A Solitary Journey, was also released in 2006. Prisoner of Fate followed in June 2007 and the final book, The Demon Horsemen, was published in July 2008.

Body of Works

Andrakis Trilogy
Guardians (The Waking Dragon) (1992/2006)
Kingmaker (The Maker of Kings) (1993/2006)
Dragon Lords (The Dragonlord War) (1993/2006)

The Andrakis fantasy series follows the interwoven fates of the central characters, Andra – a warrior with a prophetic future, and A Ahmud Ki – a sorcerer determined to become a dragonlord. The Andrakis world and many of the characters originated from a host of Dungeons and Dragons style games that Shillitoe created and ran for several playing groups throughout the 1980s. The series enjoyed a run of success, although the third book struggled to make sales, perhaps because its unique cover design made it seem not to belong to the first two books .

The Ashuak Chronicles
Blood (2002)
Passion (2003)
Freedom (2003)

The central character of the series, Alwyn, is loosely based on Gandhi and Christ because the character tries to resolve the conflicts of his world through reason and passive resistance.

Dreaming in Amber
The Amber Legacy (2006)
A Solitary Journey (2006)
Prisoner of Fate (2007)
The Demon Horsemen (2008)

Book one, The Amber Legacy, focuses on the fate of Meg farmer, a 16yo girl who discovers that she has inherited magical skill for her line of ancestors and is the only person who can intervene in the impending doom facing her people.

The story follows Meg's life journey from age sixteen to her seventies as she is caught up in world-changing events despite her efforts to stay out of them. The series also brings back to life a key character from the original Andrakis series – A Ahmud Ki – who has a chance to redeem himself. All ten of Shillitoe's fantasy novels – the Andrakis trilogy, the Ashuak Chronicles trilogy, and the Dreaming in Amber quartet – are drawn together into a single saga by the Dreaming in Amber series.

Other works
The Last Wizard (1995)
Joy Ride (1999)
Caught in the Headlights (2003)
Tales of the Dragon (2006) (A collation of previous stories)
In My Father's Shadow (2015)
The Need (2015)
The Red Heart (2016), short story collection

Short stories
"The Innkeeper" (1996) in Dream Weavers (ed. Paul Collins)
"Jammin' (1997) in The Girl Who Married a Fly (ed. Michael Hyde)
"The Book of Lore" (1998) in Fantastic Worlds (ed. Paul Collins)
"The Lure" (1998) in Solo Spots (ed. Chris Tugwell and Ruth Starke)
"Assassin" (1999) in Harbinger #2
"Virtual God" (2000) in Altair #5 (ed. Robert N. Stephenson, Jim Deed & Andrew Collings)
"The Mother Anger" (2000) in Altair #6 & 7 (ed. Robert N. Stephenson, Jim Deed & Andrew Collings)
"The Sculptor" (2000) in Altair #6 & 7 (ed. Robert N. Stephenson, Jim Deed & Andrew Collings)
"Hope" (2015) in From Out of the Darkness (ed. Robert N. Stephenson)

Awards and nominations

Aurealis Awards
Fantasy division
Finalist: The Last Wizard (1995)
Finalist: Blood (2002)

Facts 
After Martin Middleton, Tony Shillitoe was the second Australian author to be given a contract for an adult fantasy series in Australia.

References

External links
 Official site
 Altair Books Pty Ltd – Publisher of the Andrakis Trilogy & Tales of the Dragon
 HarperCollins Publishers Australia – Author Details

Australian fantasy writers
People from Tailem Bend, South Australia
Living people
1955 births
Australian male novelists